is a district located in Nagano Prefecture, Japan.

As of December 1, 2005, the district has an estimated population of 16,742. The total area is 53.64 km2.

Currently, there is only one town in this district.
Sakaki

Mergers
On September 1, 2003 the town of Togura merged with the town of Kamiyamada, from Sarashina District, and the city of Koshoku to form the new city of Chikuma.

Districts in Nagano Prefecture